Frank Nicholas Wolf (February 22, 1897 – April 3, 1949) was an American football and basketball player and coach. He served as the head football coach at Waynesburg College—now known as Waynesburg University in Waynesburg, Pennsylvania, from 1921 to 1922 and again from 1928 to 1941, compiling a record of 65–63–10.

Biography
Wolf was born on February 22, 1897, in McKeesport, Pennsylvania, and graduated from Pennsylvania State College in 1921. At Penn State, he lettered in football, basketball, and baseball.

Wolf was also the head basketball coach at Waynesburg from 1921 to 1923 and again from 1928 to 1943, tallying a mark of 207–141. 1939, Wolf coached Waynesburg against Fordham in the first football game ever televised.

Wolf died on April 3, 1949, of a cerebral hemorrhage, at his home in Mt. Lebanon, Pennsylvania.

Head coaching record

College football

References

1897 births
1949 deaths
American men's basketball players
Basketball coaches from Pennsylvania
Basketball players from Pennsylvania
Penn State Nittany Lions baseball players
Penn State Nittany Lions football players
Penn State Nittany Lions basketball players
Waynesburg Yellow Jackets football coaches
Waynesburg Yellow Jackets men's basketball coaches
High school football coaches in West Virginia
Sportspeople from McKeesport, Pennsylvania
Coaches of American football from Pennsylvania
Players of American football from Pennsylvania